Mario Brlečić (born 10 January 1989) is a Croatian football midfielder, currently playing for NK Gaj Mače.

Club career
He came up through the youth academy of NK Varteks, making his professional debut with their senior club in 2008; the club changed its name to NK Varaždin in 2010. He returned to the city of Varaždin in 2018, playing for a new NK Varaždin, unassociated with his original club, which folded in 2015. In 2015 he played 9 games for Icelandic top-tier club ÍB Vestmannaeyjar.

References

External links

Mario Brlečić at Sportnet.hr 

1989 births
Living people
Footballers from Zagreb
Association football midfielders
Croatian footballers
Croatia youth international footballers
NK Varaždin players
HNK Segesta players
NK Inter Zaprešić players
NK Zelina players
RNK Split players
NK Zavrč players
CS Concordia Chiajna players
NK Travnik players
Íþróttabandalag Vestmannaeyja players
NK Celje players
Croatian Football League players
First Football League (Croatia) players
Slovenian PrvaLiga players
Liga I players
Premier League of Bosnia and Herzegovina players
Úrvalsdeild karla (football) players
Second Football League (Croatia) players
Croatian expatriate footballers
Croatian expatriate sportspeople in Slovenia
Croatian expatriate sportspeople in Romania
Croatian expatriate sportspeople in Iceland
Croatian expatriate sportspeople in Bosnia and Herzegovina
Expatriate footballers in Slovenia
Expatriate footballers in Romania
Expatriate footballers in Iceland
Expatriate footballers in Bosnia and Herzegovina